Colletotrichum truncatum is a plant pathogen.

Symptoms 
Symptoms appear as dark red to black lesions on the lower surface of the leaves. They appear as sunken lesions surrounded by a raised brown-black border on the pods, petioles and stems. Very small black fruiting bodies of the fungus are usually visible in older lesions.

Other symptoms include shedding of leaves, flower and pod abortion.

Infected seeds appear discoloured with brown or grey staining or dark flecks.

Management 
Partners of the CABI-led programme, Plantwise including LUANAR recommend using certified, disease-free seed. If using saved seed, they recommend selecting seeds which are not shrivelled mouldy or discoloured. They also recommend rotating soybean with cereals such as maize and sorghum every 2–3 seasons and remove any diseased crop residue and bury any remaining material.

Sources

References

External links
 Image

truncatum
Fungal plant pathogens and diseases
Soybean diseases
Fungi described in 1935